Tuft or tufts or tufted can refer to:

Biology
Tufted grass, grasses growing in tussocks
Fascicle (botany), or tuft, a bundle of leaves or flowers growing closely together
specific tufts of feathers on a bird, for example a pectoral tuft
Ungual tufts, groups of hairs at the base of an animal's claws
Toe tuft, on cats
Ear tuft, fur or feathers around an animal's ear
Enamel tufts, in teeth
Tuft cell, in the intestines
See also Fascicle (disambiguation)

Other uses
Tufting in textiles
Tuft (aeronautics), a strip of string attached to an aircraft
Tuft, a decorative tassel on a hat
Tufting (composites) in the field of advanced composite materials
Tuft (surname)

See also
Toft (disambiguation)
Tofte (disambiguation)
Tufts (disambiguation)